Novokardailsky is a rural locality (a khutor) in Komsomolskoye Rural Settlement, Novonikolayevsky District, Volgograd Oblast, Russia. The population was 266 as of 2010. There are 6 streets.

Geography 
Novokardailsky is located in steppe, on the Khopyorsko-Buzulukskaya Plain, on the right bank of the Kardail River, 24 km east of Novonikolayevsky (the district's administrative centre) by road. Kleyevsky is the nearest rural locality.

References 

Rural localities in Novonikolayevsky District